Lake Tight, named for geologist William G. Tight, was a glacial lake in what is present-day Ohio, Kentucky, and West Virginia, during the Ice Age the early Pleistocene before 700,000 years.

History
Lake Tight's origins date to nearly 2 million years before the modern era. As the Ice Age began to cool the Earth, and large glaciers began to creep south from modern-day Canada, many landforms and features were changed or destroyed, including the Teays River.

The Teays had been a river for several million years, flowing north out of the Appalachian Mountains in what is now North Carolina. The river's path traveled through modern-day West Virginia, Kentucky, Ohio, Indiana, and Illinois, finally emptying into the Gulf of Mexico, which at the time extended to southern Illinois. The glaciers of the Ice Age soon began to block the Teays, effectively damming the river and forming Lake Tight, near what is now Chillicothe, Ohio.

The lake has been the repeated topic of research over the past 100 plus years. In geologic terms, the lake's life span was short; the lake appears to have formed in the Lower or Middle Pleistocene. The reverse polarity of the clays points to an age greater than 700 ka, thus Pre-Illinoian. When the lake finally overflowed, it created new drainage channels and rivers flowing south, in the opposite direction of the Teays River.

A recent study in 2014 using Geographic Information System (GIS) Technologies, has redefined the extent of Proglacial Lake Tight.  Using National Elevation Datasets (NEDs) from the USGS, the author incorporated the 275-meter (902-foot) contour elevations into a GIS, spatially correlated the contours with Ohio Department of Natural Resources' GIS glacial, geologic, and topographic datasets, and developed a revised lake boundary that shows the areal extent of Proglacial Lake Tight was approximately 40% larger than has been previously estimated, covering some 25,740 km2 (9,940 sq mi).  This revised boundary shows that Lake Tight was as large as Lake Erie at its greatest extent.  Mapped deposits of the  Minford Silt Member of the Teays Formation provide strong evidence for the GIS revised boundary of Proglacial Lake Tight; the Minford's distribution, especially in tributary valleys at the lake's fringes, is compelling evidence for the GIS Lake Tight model.

See also
Teays River
Lake Monongahela

References

External links
Ohio's Ancient Nile
Ohio's Ancient Nile (archived)

Former lakes of the United States
Geology of West Virginia
Geology of Ohio
Geology of Kentucky
Glacial lakes of the United States